Bholath Assembly constituency (Sl. No.: 26) is a Punjab Legislative Assembly constituency of Bholath in Kapurthala district, Punjab state, India. Sukhpal Khaira won this seat on Aam Aadmi Party party ticket in 2017 Punjab Legislative Assembly election but later on created a new party Punjab Ekta Party in 2019, and later, in June 2021, he joined the Indian National Congress.

Members of the Legislative Assembly

Election results

2022

2017

Previous results

References

External links
  

Assembly constituencies of Punjab, India
Kapurthala district